May Nwae was a Burmese actress and singer. She won the first Best Supporting Actress Award in the history of Burmese Flim Industry. She starred in numerous films and videos from World War II to the video era.

Early life and careers

May Nwae was born on February 13, 1919, to U Pe Hla and Daw Thein Shin. She was the youngest of five siblings. He studied up to the seventh grade and studied music with Sayar Nyein Gyi, Shwe Pyi Aye, Khin Myint Gyi and Saw Mya Aye Kyi. She also learned traditional  Burmese dance from Lakshna U Kyaw,  Sein Op and Thein Op. She has been performing in Myanmar Drama Event since she was 9 years old. She later appeared as an Burmese dance actress as "Hinthar Sein".

In 1936, she made her film debut  with actor Ba Tint in 1976 at the age of 17, starring in "Ye Bet Taw" and entered the film industry. After fleeing the war in World War II, she co-founded Aung Mingalar Drama troupe with a play led by Dagon Tin and performed throughout Upper Burma. She also co-played in Drama troupes such as Aung Lan Taw Khin Sein, U Phoe Sein Gyi, U Sein Aung Min and Bo K Than Sein. In 1938, she sang the songs of the period and formed the San Thida Band. She also sang in dramas and movie soundtracks. In 1949, she re-entered the film industry with the film Yan Pyae Man Pyae, directed by Shwe Don Be Aung, and made several films as the lead actress. She won the Best Supporting Actress award for her films Shwe Yin Thein Thit in 1962 and Shwe Chi Ngwe Chi Tan Bar Loh (Gold and Silver Ribbons) in 1975.

Awards and nominations

Personal life
May married to U Kyi Maung. They have two daughters and three sons.

Death
She died in Yangon on January 20, 2008, at the age of 89.

References

1910s births
2008 deaths
20th-century Burmese actresses
Burmese film actresses

my:မေနွဲ့